Leonardo D'Ascenzo (born 31 August 1961) is an Italian Roman Catholic prelate.

He was born on 31 August 1961, and ordained to the priesthood in 1986, and began serving the Suburbicarian Diocese of Velletri-Segni. D'Ascenzo was appointed archbishop of Trani-Barletta-Bisceglie on 4 November 2017, following the death of Giovan Battista Pichierri. D'Ascenzo was ordained a bishop on 14 January 2018, and formally installed on 27 January 2018.

References

1961 births
Living people
Italian Roman Catholic archbishops